Howmeh Rural District is a rural district (dehestan) in the Central District of Maneh and Samalqan County, North Khorasan Province, Iran. At the 2006 census, its population was 15,676, in 3,898 families.  The rural district has 22 villages.

References 

Rural Districts of North Khorasan Province
Maneh and Samalqan County